Josh Jackson may refer to:
Josh Jackson or Joshua Jackson (born 1978), American-Canadian actor
Josh Jackson (basketball) (born 1997), American basketball player
Josh Jackson (quarterback) (born 1998), American football quarterback
Josh Jackson (cornerback) (born 1996), American football cornerback
Josh Jackson (rugby league) (born 1991), Australian rugby league player
Josh Jackson (rugby union) (born 1980), Canadian rugby union player